Jacksonville High School is a 5A public high school located in Jacksonville, Texas (USA). It is part of the Jacksonville Independent School District located in north central Cherokee County. In 2015, the school was rated "Met Standard" by the Texas Education Agency.

Current
Jacksonville High School has recently undergone the first major construction since the late '50s and is now more open to accommodate for the recent switch to a 5A public high school.

Athletics
The Jacksonville Indians compete in the following sports:

Baseball
Basketball
Cross Country
Football
Golf
Powerlifting
Soccer
Softball
Tennis
Track and Field
Volleyball

Football
Jacksonville and rival Nacogdoches played in the longest high-school football game in history, a 12-overtime affair in 2010 which resulted in Jacksonville winning 84-81.  Only four years later the two would play a (short, by comparison) five-overtime game, with Jacksonville again winning, this time 85-79.

State Titles
Boys Basketball - 
1956(2A)
One Act Play - 
1952(1A), 1956(1A), 1960(3A)
Honor Band (Texas Music Educators Association) - 
1984-1985 school year(4A)

Notable alumni
 Jerry Aldridge, former NFL running back
 Kevin Aldridge, former NFL defensive end
 Toby Gowin, former NFL punter
 Marshall Johnson, former NFL wide receiver
 Pete Lammons, former NFL tight end
 Margo Martindale, Emmy-winning actress of stage, TV shows, and films
 Josh McCown, NFL quarterback
 Luke McCown, former NFL quarterback
 Neal McCoy, country music singer
 James Noble, former NFL wide receiver
 Lee Ann Womack, country music singer
 Grady Nutt, Christian minister and humorist
Deborah Yates, Tony Award-nominated actress and dancer

References

External links
Jacksonville ISD
JHS Alumni (new site)
JHS Alumni (old site)

Schools in Cherokee County, Texas
Public high schools in Texas